, commonly abbreviated , is a Japanese pop band formed in Shimane, Japan in 2012 by Satoshi Fujihara (lead vocals, piano), Daisuke Ozasa (lead guitar, backing vocals), Makoto Narazaki (bass, saxophone, backing vocals) and Masaki Matsuura (drums, percussion, backing vocals).
'Hige' translates to facial hair but mostly moustache, and Dandism refers to Manly of man, commonly used in advertising to suggest manliness. So in English it roughly translates to 'Manly Moustache', or 'Macho Moustache'.

After signing a record deal with the major label Pony Canyon in 2018, Official Hige Dandism released the debut single "No Doubt", the lead single from the extended play, Stand by You EP. The following year, the band released the second single, "Pretender", which ranked at number three on the year-end chart of Billboard Japan Hot 100 in 2019. Their debut studio album Traveler was released on 9 October 2019 and reached number one on the Japan Albums Chart.

Members
Satoshi Fujihara(藤原　聡） – lead vocals, percussion, keyboards 
He was born in Tottori prefecture on August 19, 1991, and graduated from Shimane University in 2012.
He makes almost all of lyrics and composition for Official Hige Dandism. 

Daisuke Ozasa(小笹　大輔) – guitar, backing vocals 
He was born in Tottori prefecture on January 6, 1989, and graduated from Shimane University in 2011.

Makoto Narazaki(楢崎　誠) – bass guitar, saxophone, backing vocals 
He was born in Hiroshima prefecture on January 6, 1994.
Masaki Matsuura(松浦　匡希) – drums, percussion, backing vocals 
He was born in Tottori prefecture on January 13, 1993.
He designs Official Hige Dandism goods and LINE stamps.

History
The band was formed on June 7, 2012.

They released their Indies Debut Mini Album “Love to Peace ha kimi no naka (ラブとピースは君の中)” on April 22, 2015.

They released their Major Debut Single “No Doubt (ノーダウト)” on April 11, 2018.

On May 15, 2019, they released the hit song, "Pretender". In October, after their live performance on the popular program Music Station, the song topped the Japan Hot 100.

On 2019, the band released "Shukumei" as the official song for the edition 101 of the National High School Baseball Championship.

On September 4, 2019, Abema TV announced that Official Hige Dandism would be producing the song "Break it Down" for Airi Suzuki's second album. On December 31, 2019, they attended the 70th NHK Kōhaku Uta Gassen with the song “Pretender”.

On December 31, 2020, they attended the 71st NHK Kōhaku Uta Gassen with the song “I LOVE...”.

On March 12, 2021, it was announced that the band will provide the opening theme song "Cry Baby" for the anime Tokyo Revengers, premiering in April 2021.

On March 17, 2022, it was announced that the band will provide the opening theme song "Mixed Nuts" for the anime Spy × Family, premiering in April 2022.

In 2023, their song "White Noise" was used as the opening theme song for anime Tokyo Revengers Season 2.

Discography

Studio albums

Live albums

Extended plays

Singles

Collaboration

Other charted and certified songs

Videography

Video albums

Awards and nominations

Notes

References

External links
 

Japanese pop rock music groups
Musical groups established in 2012
2012 establishments in Japan
Musical quartets
Pony Canyon artists